The men's doubles competition of the 2022 European Table Tennis Championships was held from 13 to 18 August 2022.

Playing system 
World MD ranking week 28; 12.07.2022.
52 pairs
16 pairs are directly qualified for the main draw as a seeded pairs.
Qualification stage: 36 pairs will play qualification in two preliminary rounds. The winners of the preliminary round 2 matches will qualify
for the Main draw.

Preliminary round 
The winners of the preliminary round 2 matches will qualify for the Main draw.

Main Draw 
Main Draw

Participating nations 
100 players from 36 nations.

References

External links 
European Table Tennis Union
Munich 2022

2022 European Table Tennis Championships